Signori is both a surname and a given name. Notable people with the name include:

Céline Signori (born 1938), Canadian politician
Francesco Signori (born 1988), Italian footballer
Giuseppe Signori (born 1968), Italian footballer
Signori António (born 1994), Angolan footballer